State Road 357 in the U.S. state of Indiana is a very short north–south state highway in Gibson County, entirely within the city of Oakland City.

Route description

State Road 357 starts at State Road 64, which is also Morton Street, on the south side of town.  It runs north for about 200 feet, then veers to the north-northeast and runs parallel with the railroad track about 100 feet to the east.  Upon reaching Mill Street, the road veers back to the north and proceeds to its northern terminus at State Road 57 at the north edge of town.  It is concurrent with Main Street over its entire length.

Major intersections

References

357
Transportation in Gibson County, Indiana